Gemel Smith  (born April 16, 1994) is a Canadian professional ice hockey forward for the Henderson Silver Knights of the American Hockey League (AHL) on loan while under contract to the Tampa Bay Lightning of the National Hockey League (NHL). He has previously played with the Dallas Stars, who selected him 104th overall in the 2012 NHL Entry Draft, as well as the Boston Bruins and Detroit Red Wings.

Playing career
Smith first played midget hockey with the Markham Majors before playing with the North York Rangers of the Greater Toronto Major Midget Hockey League before he was selected 120th overall in the Ontario Hockey League's 2010 OHL Priority Selection by the Owen Sound Attack. In his first major junior season in 2010–11 with the Attack he finished with 16 points in 66 games.

After completing his OHL career with the London Knights, he was signed by the Dallas Stars to a three-year, entry-level contract on May 31, 2014. He made his professional debut in the following 2014–15 season, after he was assigned by the Stars to AHL affiliate, the Texas Stars. In 68 games with Texas, Smith contributed with 10 goals and 27 points in 68 games as a rookie.

In the 2016–17 season, with a rash of injuries suffered in Dallas, Smith received his first recall to the NHL on October 22, 2016. He made his NHL debut with the Stars that night, skating on the fourth-line in a 3–0 loss to the Columbus Blue Jackets. In his seventh game with the Stars, Smith scored his first two NHL goals in a 4–3 overtime loss to the Chicago Blackhawks on November 6, 2016.

On July 11, 2017, the Stars re-signed Smith to a one-year, two-way contract worth $650,000. In his first full season with the club, Smith recorded six goals and 11 points in 46 games, often finding himself as a healthy scratch.

On August 3, 2018, the Stars re-signed Smith to a one-year, $720,000 contract extension. During the 2018–19 season, on December 6, Smith was claimed off waivers by the Boston Bruins. Smith appeared in 3 games with Boston before he was re-assigned to affiliate, the Providence Bruins, upon clearing waivers on December 19, 2018. In playing out his contract in Providence, Smith was an offensive presence in contributing with 40 points in 47 games.

As an impending restricted free agent, Smith was not tendered a qualifying offer by the Bruins, releasing him as a free agent on June 25, 2019. He signed a one-year, two-way contract with the Tampa Bay Lightning on July 8, 2019.

Smith was one of the eight players called up to the Lightning for their training camp prior to the 2020 Stanley Cup playoffs.

Following back-to-back championships with the Lightning, Smith began the  season on the long-term injured reserve. In returning to health, Smith was claimed off waivers from the Lightning by the Detroit Red Wings on January 19, 2022. He was assigned by the Red Wings to a conditioning stint with AHL affiliate, the Grand Rapids Griffins, on January 23, 2022.

On February 19, 2022, the Lightning reclaimed Smith from the Red Wings, again on waivers.

In the following 2022–23 season, Smith remained within the Lightning organization, continuing with the Syracuse Crunch. While placing third in team scoring, collecting 37 points through 35 games, Smith left the Crunch after he was re-assigned on loan by the Lightning to join Vegas Golden Knights AHL affiliate, the Henderson Silver Knights, on February 16, 2023.

Personal life
His younger brother, Givani, was drafted by the Detroit Red Wings in the second round of the 2016 NHL Entry Draft.

During the 2018–19 NHL season, Smith was battling depression-like symptoms and had a hard time sleeping. He said he "made himself go into a sunken place". While with the Boston Bruins, Patrice Bergeron suggested he get help.

Career statistics

Regular season and playoffs

International

References

External links
 

1994 births
Living people
Black Canadian ice hockey players
Boston Bruins players
Canadian ice hockey centres
Dallas Stars draft picks
Dallas Stars players
Detroit Red Wings players
Grand Rapids Griffins players
Henderson Silver Knights players
Idaho Steelheads (ECHL) players
London Knights players
Owen Sound Attack players
Providence Bruins players
Ice hockey people from Toronto
Syracuse Crunch players
Tampa Bay Lightning players
Texas Stars players